Lynn Creek is a creek in Tarrant County, Texas. The creek rises in south Arlington, and runs to the east, through the Lynn Creek Linear Park, passing under Texas State Highway 360 before meeting Joe Pool Lake near Grand Prairie.

See Also
 Rush Creek

References 

Rivers of Texas
Tarrant County, Texas